Durrant is a surname. Notable people with the surname include:

Andi Durrant (born 1981), English radio presenter, DJ and music producer
Devin Durrant (born 1960), American retired basketball player
Glen Durrant (born 1970), English darts player
Ian Durrant (born 1966), Scottish former footballer
Theodore Durrant (1871–1898), Canadian-American convicted and executed for two murders
Durrant baronets

See also
Durant (disambiguation)